Bijan Rezaei (born 20 December 1964) is a Swedish weightlifter. He competed in the men's heavyweight I event at the 1992 Summer Olympics.

References

1964 births
Living people
Swedish male weightlifters
Olympic weightlifters of Sweden
Weightlifters at the 1992 Summer Olympics
People from Gilan Province
20th-century Swedish people